Parameciidae is a family of ciliates in the order Peniculida. Members of this family have differentiated anterior and posterior regions and are bounded by a hard but elastic pellicle. The family contains the genera Paramecium and Physanter.

References

External links 
 

Ciliate families
Oligohymenophorea